The Lions of Marash: Personal Experiences with American Near East Relief, 1919-1922 is a book by Stanley Kerr which documents eye-witness accounts during the Armenian Genocide.

Background 
In 1920, the French garrison at Marash withdrew and left behind over 20,000 Armenians who were subsequently massacred or forced to flee. However, American philanthropy through Near East Relief saved many starving Armenian women and children from Turkish aggression. Stanley E. Kerr, a Sanitary Corps officer in the US Army, was among the volunteers who responded to the American Committee for Relief in the Near East's call for help in 1919. Kerr took over relief operations in Marash after the French withdrawal and risked his life to assist the Armenians, despite the Turkish perception of Americans as collaborators with the French and Armenians. In his book, Dr. Kerr recounts his experiences, drawing from various sources including French officers, priests, Turkish military historians, and Armenian survivors. The book provides a personal account of the events in Marash and sheds light on the work of American philanthropy and the challenges faced by relief workers during this tumultuous time.

References

Armenian genocide
Genocide
Genocidal massacres